Waverly Arthur Jackson Jr. (born December 19, 1972) is a former American football offensive tackle and guard.  He played college football at Virginia Tech. In the National Football League, he was signed by the Carolina Panthers as an undrafted free agent in 1997 and played for the Indianapolis Colts.

References

1972 births
Living people
American football offensive tackles
American football offensive guards
Virginia Tech Hokies football players
Carolina Panthers players
Indianapolis Colts players
People from South Hill, Virginia
Players of American football from Virginia